The Suspicions of Mr Whicher is a British series of television films made by Hat Trick Productions for ITV, written by Helen Edmundson and Neil McKay. It stars Paddy Considine in the title role of detective inspector Jack Whicher of the Metropolitan Police. The first film, The Murder at Road Hill House (broadcast in 2011), was based on the real-life Constance Kent murder case of 1860, as interpreted by Kate Summerscale in her 2008 book The Suspicions of Mr Whicher or The Murder at Road Hill House, which was the winner of Britain's Samuel Johnson Prize for Non-Fiction in 2008, and was read as BBC Radio 4's Book of the Week in April the same year.

Subsequent TV episodes are fictionalised accounts of Whicher's career as a private enquiry agent. McKay wrote the first of these, The Suspicions of Mr Whicher: The Murder In Angel Lane, which was filmed in early 2013 and was broadcast on 12 May 2013. It was followed by two episodes written by Edmundson, The Suspicions of Mr Whicher: Beyond the Pale, broadcast on 7 September 2014, and The Suspicions of Mr Whicher: The Ties that Bind, broadcast on 14 September 2014. Considine later announced on Twitter that the show would not be continuing.

The Suspicions of Mr Whicher: The Murder at Road Hill House

Synopsis
When three-year-old Saville Kent is found murdered in dreadful circumstances at the family home in Wiltshire, Commissioner Mayne (Tim Pigott-Smith) sends Scotland Yard detective Inspector Jack Whicher (Paddy Considine) to investigate the crime. Local Superintendent Foley (Tom Georgeson) believes that the murder is an 'inside job', committed by Saville's nurse Elizabeth Gough (Kate O'Flynn), whom he suspects the child had seen in bed with a man, possibly the child's father, Samuel Kent (Peter Capaldi) but whom he is forced to release due to lack of evidence.

When Whicher arrives, Foley, suspicious of this outsider and his progressive police methods, reluctantly agrees to help. The focus of Whicher's investigation is a torn and blood-stained piece from a woman's undergarment that had been found during the initial search for the missing boy. Constance Kent (Alexandra Roach), Samuel Kent's sixteen-year-old daughter from his first marriage, claims that one of her three night-gowns had been lost by the laundress. When Dr. Stapleton (Ben Miles), the family's doctor tells Whicher that Constance, like her late mother, is mentally unstable and resentful of Saville, her father's son from his second marriage, she immediately becomes Whicher's prime suspect. It is discovered that Constance and her younger brother William Saville-Kent (Charlie Hiett) hate their stepmother Mary (Emma Fielding) — who had, in fact, been employed as their former nanny, with whom their father had had an affair while their mother was dying.

He visits a schoolmate of Constance, Emma Moody, who tells him that Constance enjoyed hurting Saville. As the circumstantial evidence builds, Whicher arrests Constance, he having been convinced that she had killed her half-brother out of revenge against her father for his treatment of her mother and his neglect of her and William, but he fails to get a confession from her or William. Whicher desperately seeks Constance's missing nightdress, which he believes she wore while murdering her half-brother, as the key evidence to proving her guilt.

He suspects Constance disposed of the blood-soaked nightdress after the murder, and tricked everyone into believing it had been lost by the washerwoman. However, he cannot find the nightdress and at her trial, her lawyer discredits Whicher's case by wilfully misrepresenting it. Emma Moody is called as a witness, but she lies and states that Constance adored her half-brother, and Constance is acquitted. Whicher accuses Mr. Kent of abetting the wrongful acquittal.

Whicher's reputation is destroyed. He suffers a breakdown and leaves the police force. Five years later, in 1865, Constance confesses her guilt to a clergyman, the Rev. Arthur Wagner (Antony Byrne), and is re-tried. In court the Rev. Wagner gives a declaration that he must withhold any information on the grounds that it had been received under the seal of "sacramental confession". At the same time it is revealed that Superintendent Foley had withheld evidence from Whicher during the original investigation. This time Constance Kent admits her guilt, but refuses to corroborate Whicher's theory that her brother was also involved in the murder.

Constance Kent is sentenced to death.  However, viewers are informed by means of captions that due to public outcry after the trial the sentence is commuted to life in prison, that she is released after serving twenty years, and that she emigrates to Australia where she dies at the age of 100.

Cast

 Paddy Considine ...  Detective Jack Whicher
 Peter Capaldi ...  Samuel Kent
 Tom Georgeson ...  Superintendent Foley
 William Beck ...  'Dolly' Williamson
 Emma Fielding ...  Mary Kent
 Tim Pigott-Smith ...  Commissioner Mayne
 Kate O'Flynn...  Elizabeth Gough
 Donald Sumpter ...  Peter Edlin QC
 Ben Miles ...  Dr. Stapleton
 Alexandra Roach ...  Constance Kent
 Jay Simpson ...  George Redman
 Peter Gordon  ...  Holcombe
 Charlie Hiett...  William Kent
 Sarah Ridgeway ...  Sarah Cox
 Ben Crompton ...  William Nutt
 Ruairi Conaghan ...  Benger
 Anthony Hunt...  Constable Urch
 Julian Firth ...  MP
 Richard Lintern ...  Henry Ludlow
 Katy Murphy ...  Mrs. Holley
 Beth Cooke ...  Emma Moody
 Lizzie Hopley ...  Harriet Gollop
 Andrew Woodall ...  Magistrate
 Antony Byrne ...  Reverend Wagner (as Anthony Byrne)
 Lucy Scarfe...  Elizabeth Kent (uncredited)

The drama was directed by James Hawes and was written by Neil McKay, based on the book The Suspicions of Mr Whicher or The Murder at Road Hill House by Kate Summerscale.

The Suspicions of Mr Whicher: The Murder In Angel Lane

The second film in the series was made in 2013. Paddy Considine returned as Whicher, now a private inquiry agent. Olivia Colman co-starred. The script was written by  Neil McKay. It was directed by Christopher Menaul with Mark Redhead as executive producer, and Rob Bullock as producer.
It was filmed on location in Oxfordshire, Bedfordshire, and central London in early 2013.

Synopsis
Former police Detective Inspector Jack Whicher (Paddy Considine) finds wealthy Susan Spencer (Olivia Colman) searching for her 16-year-old niece Mary Drew in a low public house in London's notorious Angel Lane. She enlists his services to find her niece. Mary is found brutally murdered in Angel Lane, robbed of a family heirloom and having recently given birth to a child, Spencer persuades Whicher to work for her privately to investigate the murder.

The search begins for Stephen Gann (William Postlethwaite), Mary's 19-year-old lover and the father of her child. Whicher finds the missing child at a refuge for fallen women run by Roman Catholic nuns which had taken her in. Some days later he confronts Gann, who in a struggle pulls a knife which appears to be the murder weapon and makes his escape, leaving the knife behind.

Whicher seeks the help of his former colleagues in the Metropolitan Police, including 'Dolly' Williamson (William Beck) and Commissioner Mayne (Tim Pigott-Smith), but, with the exception of Inspector Lock (Shaun Dingwall), they warn Whicher off from interfering in what is a police matter.  When Whicher visits Miss Spencer’s country home he learns that her father had been murdered by Gann’s father.

Whicher’s investigation takes him to a lunatic asylum, to question Gann's grandfather, where his suspicions lead to a fresh grave being reopened but without finding the body he expects to be found hidden in it. Shaken by his failure and convinced that he no longer possesses the skills necessary to solve the crime Whicher decides to give up the investigation but then discovers a new clue after Mary Drew’s funeral when he finds Stephen Gann at Mary's grave. Whicher seems to be close to solving the case and returns to the asylum where he is accused of being mentally unstable and after a struggle is strapped into a straitjacket and locked up at the instigation of Dr Casement (Alistair Petrie) and Inspector Lock.

Stephen Gann's grandfather is also an inmate in the asylum. He finally reveals the identity of Susan Spencer's father's murderer. It was his other son, Gann's wealthy uncle, Thomas, who was also the father of Mary Drew. Whicher makes his escape and confronts those responsible for her murder in a chilling finale.

Cast

 Paddy Considine ... Inspector Jack Whicher
 Olivia Colman ... Susan Spencer
 William Beck ... Chief Inspector 'Dolly' Williamson
 Tim Pigott-Smith ... Commissioner Mayne
 Shaun Dingwall ... Inspector George Lock
 William Postlethwaite ... Stephen Gann
 Mark Bazeley ... Thomas Gann
 Sean Baker ... Joshua Gann
 Alistair Petrie ... Dr. Casement
 Joanna Jeffrees ... Nursemaid
 Siobhan O'Neill ... Housemaid
 Asher Kemp ... Baby Stephen
 Justine Mitchell ... Sister Anne
 Nancy Carroll (British actress) ... Charlotte
 Sam Barnard ... Robert
 Justin Edwards ... Rev. Marlow
 Jody Halse ... Clarence Shaw
 Andy Gathergood ... Sergeant Parker
 James Wilson ... Pickpocket Youth
 Brett Allen ... Landlord
 Neal Barry ... Finch
 Tom Padley ... Pub Bystander
 Carolyn Tomkinson ... Creed's Woman
 Nick Caldecott ... Dr. Drake
 Mark Kempner ... Toby

The Suspicions of Mr Whicher: Beyond the Pale

Synopsis
Mr Whicher is approached by Sir Edward Shore MP, who had been Home Secretary when Whicher was dismissed from the police force (he signed the dismissal letter). Sir Edward wants Whicher to look into threats made against his son Charles, who has recently returned to London from India with his wife and children. Charles is being pursued by Asim Jabour, an Indian 
seeking money or revenge, now passing as a lascar (Indian sailor) in the Docklands.

Sir Edward wants the affair dealt with secretly, not by the police. But then Asim is found murdered, and Whicher demands that the Shores tell him the whole story and identify the dead man to the police. Whicher's investigation uncovers betrayal and interracial secrets in both Docklands and upper-class London.

The historic Chatham Dockyard in Kent was used as a film location for some of the London streets and docks.

The Suspicions of Mr Whicher: The Ties That Bind

Synopsis
Whicher follows a married woman through London to a secret assignation. He is bearing witness to an open and shut case that will lead to divorce for Sir Henry Coverley from his wife Lady Jane. But, when the co-respondent is killed, a simple case soon spirals out of control, embracing love, desire, gambling, corruption, theft and an illicit passion that leads to murder.

References

External links
 
 "Filming The Suspicions of Mr Whicher", The Daily Telegraph, 18 April 2011
 Review of The Suspicions of Mr Whicher, New Statesman, 5 May 2011
 The Suspicions of Mr Whicher: Costume Q&A with Lucinda Wright, Clothes on Film website
 
 The Suspicions of Mr Whicher II, ITV Media
 The Suspicions of Mr Whicher: The Murder in Angel Lane, cast list

2011 British television series debuts
2014 British television series endings
2010s British drama television series
British television films
English-language films
ITV television dramas
Helen Edmundson
Television series by Hat Trick Productions